Women's lightweight double sculls competition at the 2008 Summer Olympics in Beijing was held between August 10 and 17 at the Shunyi Olympic Rowing-Canoeing Park.

This rowing event is a double sculls event, meaning that each boat is propelled by a pair of rowers. The "scull" portion means that the rower uses two oars, one on each side of the boat; this contrasts with sweep rowing in which each rower has one oar and rows on only one side. As a lightweight rowing competition, the body mass of the rowers was limited to a maximum of 59 kilograms each and 57 kilograms on average.

The competition consisted of multiple rounds. Finals were held to determine the placing of each boat; these finals were given letters with those nearer to the beginning of the alphabet meaning a better ranking. Semifinals were named based on which finals they fed, with each semifinal having two possible finals.

During the first round three heats were held. The top two boats in each heat advanced to the A/B semifinals, with the rest going to the repechage. The repechage heats gave rowers another chance at the top semifinals, as the best three boats in each of the two repechage heats also moved on to the A/B semifinals. The remaining boats went from the repechage to the C final.

Only A/B semifinals were held. For each of the two semifinal races, the top three boats moved on to the better of the two finals (the A final), while the bottom three boats went to the lesser of the two finals (the B final).

The third and final round was the Finals. Each final determined a set of rankings. The A final determined the medals, along with the rest of the places through 6th. The B final gave rankings from 7th to 12th. The C final gave the rest of the rankings, down to 17th place of the 17 boats competing.

Schedule
All times are China Standard Time (UTC+8)

Results

Heats
Qualification Rules: 1-2->SA/B, 3..->R

Heat 1

Heat 2

Heat 3

Repechages
Qualification Rules: 1-3->SA/B, 4..->FC

Repechage 1

Repechage 2

Semifinals A/B
Qualification Rules: 1-3->FA, 4..->FB

Semifinal A/B 1

Semifinal A/B 2

Finals

Final C

Final B

Final A

References

External links
NYT Olympic Report

Rowing at the 2008 Summer Olympics
Women's rowing at the 2008 Summer Olympics
Women's events at the 2008 Summer Olympics